Aldo Andrés Paniagua Benítez (born 12 July 1989 in Independencia, Paraguay) is a Paraguayan footballer who plays as a midfielder.

Career
Paniagua began his youth career with General Caballero ZC and made his first team debut with the club in 2007. After the 2008 season he joined 12 de Octubre and was a regular starter for the club at right midfield. His play with 12 de Octubre did not go unnoticed by top Paraguayan club Club Nacional who signed Paniagua for the 2010 season. Paniagua featured regularly for Nacional and also appeared in 3 matches in Copa Libertadores 2010 and scored the opening goal in a 2–0 victory over CF Monterrey on 4/21/10. In 2011 Paniagua returned to General Caballero to fortify the club for its return to the Primera División

2012 MLS SuperDraft
During January 2012, Paniagua participated in the 2012 MLS SuperDraft in hopes of getting selected by a club in Major League Soccer.
 He was a highlighted player in two trial games performed, and noted one goal as well.

Olimpia Asunción
On 2 January 2014, Paniagua signed with Olimpia Asunción to become their ninth signing for the 2014 season. At Olimpia, his teammates included Julio Manzur, Salustiano Candia, Carlos Humberto Paredes, Derlis Gonzalez, Uruguayan midfielder Juan Manuel Salgueiro and former under-20 national team colleague Ronald Huth.

International career
Paniagua was a member of the Paraguay national under-20 football team that participated in the 2009 FIFA U-20 World Cup in Egypt. During the tournament on 28 September, Paniagua contributed with a stoppage time goal to lead Paraguay to a 2–1 victory over Egypt at the Cairo International Stadium.

References

External links
 Playmaker Stats Profile
 
 
 

1989 births
Living people
Paraguayan footballers
Paraguay under-20 international footballers
Paraguayan Primera División players
General Caballero Sport Club footballers
12 de Octubre Football Club players
Club Nacional footballers
Club Rubio Ñu footballers
Club Olimpia footballers
Deportivo Capiatá players
Paraguayan expatriate footballers
Expatriate footballers in Bolivia
Association football defenders